The Latur City Municipal Corporation (LCMC) also known as the Municipal Corporation of  Latur City (LCMC) was established on 25 October 2011. The Maharashtra Government dissolved the council and approved forming a municipal corporation. Municipal Corporation mechanism in India was introduced during British Rule with formation of municipal corporation in Madras (Chennai) in 1688, later followed by municipal corporations in Bombay (Mumbai) and Calcutta (Kolkata) by 1762. Latur Municipal Corporation is headed by Mayor of city and governed by Commissioner. Latur Municipal Corporation has been formed with functions to improve the infrastructure of town.

Revenue sources 

The following are the Income sources for the Corporation from the Central and State Government.

Revenue from taxes  
Following is the Tax related revenue for the corporation.

 Property tax.
 Profession tax.
 Entertainment tax.
 Grants from Central and State Government like Goods and Services Tax.
 Advertisement tax.

Revenue from non-tax sources 

Following is the Non Tax related revenue for the corporation.

 Water usage charges.
 Fees from Documentation services.
 Rent received from municipal property.
 Funds from municipal bonds.

List of municipal president of Latur municipal council

List of mayors

History
The municipal council of Latur was established in October 2011. As per existing law, the then Government of Maharashtra has decided to convert LCMC into a municipal corporation due to increasing population on the basis of the 2011 census data.

Services
The following services are provided:

 Underground sewage system in the whole city
 All-weather roads
 Efficient and sustainable solid waste management
 Health coverage to all, focused more on the poor
 Primary education for the needy and library facility for all
 Upgrading of the amenities in the existing slums and alternative accommodation
 Clean, green, and pollution-free environment
 Places of healthy entertainment and recreation
 Fire service
 Efficient urban planning and development
 Transportation

Administration
The MCGL Municipal Corporation of Greater Latur (MCGL) controls the whole administration of Latur. The executive power of the corporation is vested in the commissioner, an IAS officer appointed by the Maharashtra state government. The corporation consists of directly elected corporators headed by a mayor. The mayor has few executive powers. The total number of LMC members is 70. The LMC is in charge of the civic needs and infrastructure of the metropolis. Latur is divided into 18 municipal wards, each represent four members

Corporation election

Political performance in 2012 election
The result of the 2012 election was as follows:

Political performance in 2017 election
The results of the 2017 election were as follows:

See also
 Latur Airport
 Marathwada
 Latur

References

2011 establishments in Maharashtra
Municipal corporations in Maharashtra
Latur